Sergei Nikolayevich Zozulya (born 7 February 1977) is a former Russian football player.

References

1977 births
Living people
Russian footballers
FC Sokol Saratov players
Russian Premier League players
FC Sodovik Sterlitamak players
FC Mordovia Saransk players
FC Spartak-UGP Anapa players
Association football forwards
FC Chernomorets Novorossiysk players